Alvin Rides Again is a 1974 Australian sex-comedy film sequel to Alvin Purple. It was directed by David Bilcock and Robin Copping, who were regular collaborators with Tim Burstall. It was rated M unlike its predecessor which was rated R. Alvin Rides Again still features a lot of full frontal nudity.

Plot
Alvin Purple is unable to hold down a job because of his appeal to women. He and his friend Spike help a team of women cricketers win a match by playing in drag, and decide to spend their share of the prize money in a casino. Alvin discovers he is identical in appearance to gangster Balls McGee. When Balls is killed, Alvin is forced to take his place.

Cast
 Graeme Blundell as Alvin Purple/Balls McGee
 Alan Finney as Spike Dooley
 Gus Mercurio as Jake
 Noel Ferrier as The Hatchet
 Abigail as Mae
 Jon Finlayson as The Magician
 Kris McQuade as Mandy
 Chantal Contouri as Boobs la Touche
 Jeff Ashby as Loopy Snieder
 Frank Wilson as House Detective
 Ross Bova as The Dwarf
 Briony Behets as Girl in Taxi
 Arna-Maria Winchester as Nancy
 Frank Thring as Fingers
 Clare Balmford as Employment Clerk
 Dina Mann as Woman Cricketer +cat
 Candy Raymond as Girl in Office
 Esme Melville as Cleaning Lady
 Reg Gorman as Bookmaker
 Terry Gill as Male Barracker
 John Michael Howson as Bell Boy
 Maurie Fields as Garage Proprietor

Production
Tim Burstall said neither he, Alan Hopgood nor Graeme Blundell was particularly interested in making a sequel to Alvin Purple but the film was so successful, Hexagon Productions wanted a follow-up. Blundell wanted to avoid being typecast so a story was created which gave him a chance to play a double role. Burstall, who claims he wrote most of the script with Al Finney, says that:
When it came to the crunch, Blundell failed to differentiate between paying Balls and playing Alvin pretending to be Balls. In my view, the film fails for precisely that reason, i.e. Alvin is lost.

Release
Alvin Rides Again was the recipient of some more controversy when it was released, but was only rated M. It did not perform as well as its predecessor, but still grossed $600,000 by the end of 1977 and ended up taking $1,880,000 at the box office in Australia, which is equivalent to $12,690,000 in 2009 dollars.

John D. Lamond, who worked on the film's release, thought the filmmakers made a mistake making it "less sexy, because they didn’t want to lose any potential audience...so the second one wasn’t rated R and it flopped, fell on its arse after the first month".

Home media
Alvin Rides Again was released on DVD by Umbrella Entertainment in April 2011. The DVD is compatible with region codes 2 and 4 and includes special features such as the theatrical trailer, picture gallery and interviews with Tim Burstall, Alan Hopgood and Robin Copping.

References

External links
 
 Alvin Purple Rides Again at the National Film and Sound Archive
 Alvin Rides Again at Oz Movies

1974 films
Australian sex comedy films
Australian sequel films
1970s English-language films
Films set in Australia
1970s sex comedy films
1974 comedy films